Honey West may refer to:

Honey West, a fictional private detective from novels by Gloria and Forest Fickling
Honey West (TV series), a 1965 TV series based on the character
Honey West (comics), representations of the Honey West character in comics